The 2015 South American Under-17 Football Championship was the 16th edition of the biennial international youth football tournament organized by CONMEBOL for players aged 17 and below. It was held in Paraguay from 4 to 29 March 2015.

This tournament served as CONMEBOL's qualifier for the 2015 FIFA U-17 World Cup in Chile. The top four teams, tournament champions Brazil, Argentina, Ecuador, and hosts Paraguay, qualified for the 2015 FIFA U-17 World Cup, joining Chile who automatically qualified as hosts of the 2015 FIFA U-17 World Cup.

Teams
All ten CONMEBOL member national teams entered the tournament.

Venues
Paraguay was named as host country of the tournament on 23 May 2012 at the CONMEBOL Executive Committee meeting held in Budapest, Hungary, prior to the 62nd FIFA Congress. A total of three venues were chosen to host the matches: Estadio Dr. Nicolás Léoz in Asunción, Estadio Deportivo Capiatá in Capiatá and Estadio Feliciano Cáceres, Luque.

Match officials
On 10 February 2015, CONMEBOL announced the referees and assistants referees summoned for the tournament. The assistants Ariel Scime (Argentina), Cleriston Barreto (Brazil), Carlos Changala (Uruguay) and Tulio Moreno (Venezuela) were replaced by Cristian Navarro, Bruno Boschilia, Gabriel Popovits and Luis Murillo respectively. 

 Fernando Rapallini
Assistants: Iván Núñez and Cristian Navarro
 Gery Vargas
Assistants: Javier Bustillos and Juan Pablo Montaño
 Wilton Sampaio
Assistants: Fabrício Vilarinho and Bruno Boschilia
 Roberto Tobar
Assistants: Christian Schiemann and Raúl Orellana
 Luis Alfonso Sánchez
Assistants: Alexander Guzmán and Cristian de la Cruz

 Carlos Orbe
Assistants: Juan Carlos Macías and Edwin Bravo
 Mario Díaz de Vivar
Assistants: Eduardo Cardozo and Juan Zorrilla
 Miguel Santiváñez
Assistants: Víctor Ráez and Coty Carrera
 Jonhatan Fuentes
Assistants: Gabriel Popovits and Richard Trinidad
 Jesús Valenzuela
Assistants: Luis Murillo and Elbis Gómez

Squads

Each team may register a squad of 22 players (three of whom must be goalkeepers).

Draw
The draw was held on 24 October 2014, 10:00 PYT (UTC−3), at the CONMEBOL Headquarters in Luque, Paraguay. The ten teams involved were settled in five "pairing pots" (Argentina–Brazil, Paraguay–Uruguay, Colombia–Ecuador, Chile–Peru, Bolivia–Venezuela) to be drawn into two groups of five. Initially Argentina and Brazil were announced as seeded teams, however, Paraguay (as hosts) and Uruguay were finally the teams seeded into Group A and Group B respectively and assigned to position 1 in their group. The remaining teams, including Argentina and Brazil, were drawn to determine their group as well as their position within it.

The draw results were as follows:

First stage
The top three teams in each group qualified for the final stage.

When teams finished level of points, the final order was determined according to:
 superior goal difference in all matches
 greater number of goals scored in all group matches
 better result in matches between the tied teams
 drawing of lots

All match times are in local Paraguay Time (UTC−3).

Group A

Group B

Final stage
When teams finished level of points, the final order was determined according to the same criteria as the first stage, taking into account only matches in the final stage.

All match times are in local Paraguay Time (UTC−3 for matchdays 1–2, and UTC−4 for matchdays 3–5).

Winners

Goalscorers

Qualified teams for FIFA U-17 World Cup
The following five teams from CONMEBOL qualify for the 2015 FIFA U-17 World Cup, besides Chile who qualified automatically as host.

1 Bold indicates champions for that year. Italic indicates hosts for that year.

See also
2015 FIFA U-17 World Cup

References

External links
Sudamericano Masculino Sub 17, CONMEBOL.com 

2015
2015 South American Under-17 Football Championship
2015 in South American football
2015 in Paraguayan football
2015 in youth association football